Peyton Krebs (born January 26, 2001) is a Canadian professional ice hockey center currently playing for the  Buffalo Sabres of the National Hockey League (NHL). He was drafted 17th overall by the Vegas Golden Knights in the first round of the 2019 NHL Entry Draft.

Playing career

Junior 
The Kootenay Ice named Krebs the team's 23rd captain. During the 2017–18 season, he finished first in the WHL in points among rookies with 54. He was fourth on the team in scoring as a 16-year-old.

Krebs had 19 goals and 68 points in 64 games in the 2018–19 season. He suffered an Achilles tendon injury before the 2019 NHL Entry Draft, but was selected 17th overall by the Vegas Golden Knights.

Managing his rehabilitation into the 2019–20 season, Krebs remained with and practiced with the Golden Knights before signing a three-year, entry-level contract with Vegas on November 16, 2019. Upon receiving clearance to return, Krebs was then immediately returned to the WHL, joining his newly relocated junior club the Winnipeg Ice.

Vegas Golden Knights 
Krebs made his NHL debut with the Golden Knights, registering an assist in a 6–5 defeat to the Minnesota Wild on May 3, 2021.

Buffalo Sabres 
On November 4, 2021, Krebs was traded by the Golden Knights, along with Alex Tuch, a 2022 first-round draft pick and a 2023 second-round draft pick to the Buffalo Sabres in exchange for Jack Eichel and a 2023 third-round draft pick.

International play

 

Krebs played for Team Canada, achieving 5 points in 5 games at the 2018 Hlinka Gretzky Cup, winning Gold. Krebs captained Team Canada at the 2019 IIHF World U18 Championships and led the team with 6 goals and 10 points, the highest-scoring non-American at the tournament. He earned a silver medal with Team Canada at the U-17’s in 2017.

Career statistics

Regular season and playoffs

International

Awards and honours

References

External links
 

2001 births
Living people
Buffalo Sabres players
Canadian ice hockey centres
Henderson Silver Knights players
Ice hockey people from Alberta
Kootenay Ice players
National Hockey League first-round draft picks
People from Okotoks
Rochester Americans players
Vegas Golden Knights draft picks
Vegas Golden Knights players
Winnipeg Ice players